Doug Cloud (born 1957) is a lawyer and perennial candidate, best known for running for U.S. House of Representatives from Washington's 6th congressional district five times since 2004.

Early life and education
Cloud graduated from Fife High School and received a B.A. in economics from the University of Washington before going on to earn a J.D. from the University of Washington School of Law.

Career

Legal work

Cloud began his legal career working as a prosecutor for Pierce County and Kitsap County before opening a Tacoma, Washington based law firm in 1992.

Political campaigns
Cloud, a Republican, has faced longtime congressman Norm Dicks in the general election from Washington's 6th congressional district in 2004, 2006, 2008, and 2010. His best showing was in 2010 when he received 42 percent of the vote. During that campaign he raised just short of $120,000 (40 percent of which was self-financed), being easily bested by Dicks who received $1.4 million in campaign donations. Cloud's worst performance was in 2006 when he earned less than 30-percent of the vote. In 2012, following Dicks' retirement, he again sought election from the sixth district but was eliminated in the primary.

After his defeat in 2010, Cloud sued the U.S. government over the Federal Bureau of Investigation's rejection of a Freedom of Information Act request his campaign had filed regarding a federal investigation into Dicks. Cloud had asked for the investigative files of an FBI inquiry into Dicks' involvement with PMA Group, a lobbying firm accused of influence buying. The FBI had rejected the request on the grounds that fulfilling it would constitute an invasion of Dicks' privacy.

The cornerstone of many of Cloud's past campaigns has been his opposition to the use of earmarks. He has made a special point of drawing attention to federal funding of the Puget Sound Partnership, a Washington state environmental agency formerly led by Dicks' son. "He [Dicks] used his power to set up multimillion-dollar funding to provide his kids with jobs duplicative of existing agencies," Cloud has criticized. Dicks has defended himself by asking "why should we send people [to Congress] if they don't do something to help their district?"

Cloud has also called for the repeal of the Affordable Care Act and increased enforcement of federal immigration law. He has signed the "taxpayer-protection pledge" circulated by Americans for Tax Reform.

In addition to his frequent campaigns for a seat in the United States Congress, Cloud sought appointment to the Washington House of Representatives in 2013 to fill a vacancy created by the election of Jan Angel to the Washington Senate. He came in last place in a selection vote by local Republican leadership to succeed to the seat; Jesse Young was chosen by resolution of Kitsap County board of commissioners and Pierce County council from a list of recommendations provided by Republicans.

Personal life
Cloud is married with three children and lives in Gig Harbor, Washington.

References

Living people
People from Gig Harbor, Washington
University of Washington School of Law alumni
Washington (state) Republicans
University of Washington College of Arts and Sciences alumni
1957 births